is a twotino, that is, a planetoid in a 1:2 orbital resonance with Neptune. It was discovered on November 16, 2002 at the Palomar Observatory. If its derived diameter is correct it would have a higher density than Pluto, which is unusual as it appears to be much smaller than the expected size at which a Kuiper belt object usually becomes solid.

Knowing how many twotinos there are may reveal whether Neptune took roughly 1 million or 10 million years to migrate about 7 AU from its birth location.

Satellite 

A natural satellite was reported to be orbiting  on February 27, 2007.

References

External links 
 

Twotinos
Discoveries by the Palomar Observatory
Possible dwarf planets
Binary trans-Neptunian objects
20021116